Murder is a series of Indian thriller films produced by Mahesh Bhatt and Mukesh Bhatt under the banner of Vishesh Films. The first film directed by Anurag Basu was released in 2004, second film by Mohit Suri was released in 2011, and third film by Vishesh Bhatt was released in 2013. A fourth film currently titled Murder 4 is stated to be under production.

Overview

Murder (2004)

Simran (Mallika Sherawat), starts having an extra-marital relationship with her ex-boyfriend Sunny (Emraan Hashmi). Simran's husband Sudhir Sehgal (Ashmit Patel) starts doubting his wife and keeps a detective behind her. Thus, it is revealed to Sudhir that Simran is having an affair whereas Simran learns that Sunny is a womanizer and has a girlfriend named Radhika.

Sudhir goes and kills Sunny and buries his body. Radhika files a complaint in the police station about her missing boyfriend. A few days later, Sudhir keeps getting some picture of him resembling that he had buried Sunny's body. Also, he finds that the body goes missing.

In a sudden change of events, Sunny is shown to be alive. It is revealed that the entire situation, from initiating the affair to goading Sudhir into a fight was planned in advance by Sunny, with the help of Radhika. Sunny hoped to have Sudhir imprisoned so that he could continue his affair with Simran. Sunny isolates Simran and chases her into a jungle, where Sudhir arrives and the two begin to fight. Sudhir manages to beat him, and Sunny leaves as he sees the couple together, seemingly realizing their love for each other. However, Sunny then runs up behind Sudhir with a shovel but is then shot in the back by a police officer, who arrives just in time. The couple reunites with the love developed on the strong foundations of the test of mutual support and understanding to lead a happily married life.

Murder 2 (2011)

Arjun Bhagwat (Emraan Hashmi) is a money-hungry ex-police officer involved in crime. An atheist (nastik), he regularly visits church to donate money to orphans. Priya (Jacqueline Fernandez), a model, is in a passionate but confused relationship with Arjun. Priya is in love with Arjun, who lusts after her. At the beginning of the film, he forces upon her but the relationship continues.

Arjun makes a deal with a gangster and pimp, Sameer, in order to solve the mystery of unexplained disappearance of his prostitutes. While investigating, Arjun finds a phone number linked to the missing girls. He tells Sameer to send a prostitute to the number. Sameer decides to send Reshma (Sulagna Panigrahi), a 17-year-old college newcomer in the business, who has entered prostitution to feed her family, though keeps this a secret from them. Reshma is sent to the house of Dheeraj Pandey (Prashant Narayanan), who is actually a psychopathic murderer responsible for torturing and killing the missing hookers. He decides to do the same with Reshma and throws her in a dark well, with the intention of torturing her till she dies.

Arjun meets Dheeraj's family, who reveal that Dheeraj used to beat his wife. He next meets a private dancer, Sonia, who had also been tortured by Dheeraj, but managed to escape. Arjun then meets an idol-maker who used to work with Dheeraj. The maker tells him that Dheeraj used to make idols of devils instead of deities and killed the factory-owner who tried to stop him.
Inspector Sadaa (Sudhanshu Pandey) informs Arjun that Dheeraj is free, and the police try to track him down as quickly as possible. Nirmala and Dheeraj enter the same temple where Reshma is hiding. Nirmala and the priest, who had both been unaware of Dheeraj's true nature, are killed by Dheeraj, but not before the priest reveals that Reshma is there. Dheeraj finds the terrified Reshma and brutally murders her, escaping just before Arjun and the cops arrive. Arjun finds Reshma's body and breaks down, feeling guilty and responsible for her death.

Dheeraj targets Priya next whom he calls for a photoshoot and tries to torture, but Arjun saves her, engaging Dheeraj in a fight as police officers show up. They request Arjun not to kill Dheeraj. Dheeraj then plays the tape he recorded when he was torturing Reshma. Hearing Reshma's pleading cries, Arjun, tormented by her death and blaming himself for it, furiously kills Dheeraj, ending his reign of terror once and for all. As the film ends, Arjun visits a church with Priya, implying that he had a faith in god and Priya's near death has made him realize his love for her.

Murder 3 (2013)

The film opens with Vikram (Randeep Hooda), a hot-shot fashion and wildlife photographer, viewing a video of his girlfriend, Roshni (Aditi Rao Hydari) telling him she is leaving him. Vikram becomes distraught. While drinking away his sorrows at a bar, he meets Nisha (Sara Loren) and they have a relationship where Nisha moves into the house that Vikram was sharing with Roshni. Vikram becomes a suspect in the disappearance of Roshni, however, the investigators can find no evidence of Vikram's involvement in Roshni's disappearance.

It is revealed that the house is owned by a German lady who shows Roshni a secret room built to hide her husband just in case someone came to look for him because he was in British Army at the time of 1947. The room is self-contained.

In a flashback, it is also shown that Roshni, jealous of Vikram's relationship with one of his colleague, decided to pretend she is leaving him. She creates the video saying she is leaving as she hides in the secret room. The room has some one way mirrors where she can observe Vikram's reaction. When she decides he has had enough she looks for the key and realizes she lost the key and is now trapped in the room with no way to contact him.

Nisha finds the key to the secret room, but she does not know what it is used for. Also, Nisha finds something spooky in the house. However, after few days she gets to know that Roshni is alive and is being trapped inside the secret room. But, Nisha does not help her as she did not want to lose Vikram. Nisha gets curious and opens the door and finds Roshni sleeping, wherein she hits a glass bottle on Nisha's head making her unconscious. Roshni elopes away from there and locks Nisha in the secret room. Thus, the police find Nisha disappeared and eventually arrest Vikram.

The film ends with Roshni tearing the photograph of her and Vikram and goes far away from there.

Films

Murder

The first installment of the series is based on the 1969 French film The Unfaithful Wife by Claude Chabrol. Murder was released on 2 April 2004 and, despite receiving mixed reviews from critics, managed to become a highly successful venture at the box office, earning a "super hit" status from Box Office India. The film was a huge breakthrough for its lead actors, particularly Hashmi and Sherawat. It received an A certificate from the Indian Censor Board for its erotic subject and scenes. The film becomes the highest grossing Bollywood film in Indian history in 2011.

Murder 2

A sequel, Murder 2, was commissioned after the success of the previous film and is directed by Mohit Suri, with Emraan Hashmi and Jacqueline Fernandez. The film is alleged to be based on the 2008 South Korean film The Chaser, though Bhatt denied this and said that it was inspired from the 2006 Nithari killings in Noida. The film is remembered for its erotic scenes. It was released on 8 July 2011 (worldwide), and received mixed to positive reviews from various critics of India. Proving to be similarly successful to the first entry in the series, the film became another profitable addition to the franchise, having earned ₹115 crore worldwide, from a budget of ₹50 crore.

Murder 3

After the success of the previous films, Bhatt hinted that there would be another sequel. The film was titled as M3, but then changed to Murder 3. Film is directed by Vishesh Bhatt and also the third installment in this series. The film stars Randeep Hooda, Aditi Rao Hydari and Sara Loren in lead roles. The film is an official remake of the Colombian thriller The Hidden Face. It was released on 15 February 2013 to mixed reviews and performed poorly at the box office.

Future films

Murder 4 (2024)
Despite the failure of the third film, the makers have stated that they will continue the franchise and take it to the fourth and final installment in this series. Rajneesh Duggal will also be a part of the fourth part.

Recurring cast and characters 
This table lists the main characters who appear in the Murder franchise.

Additional crew and production details

Inspirations
The first Murder was an uncredited remake of  1969 French film The Unfaithful Wife by Claude Chabrol. Murder 2 was an uncredited remake of South Korean film The Chaser. Murder 3 was an official remake of the Colombian thriller The Hidden Face.

Release and revenue

See also
 Raaz (film series)

References

External links
 
 
 
 
 
 

Indian film series
2000s Hindi-language films
Indian erotic thriller films
Thriller film series
2010s Hindi-language films